KTCM (97.3 FM, "Glory 97") is a radio station licensed to serve Madison, Missouri, United States.  The station, established in 2007, is currently owned by Alpha Media with the broadcast license held by Alpha Media Licensee LLC.

Programming
KTCM broadcasts a Contemporary Christian Music format to the greater Moberly, Missouri, area. KTCM also carries the Dave Ramsey Show during the weekday afternoon hours. On weekends KTCM broadcasts the hour-long "Lighthouse Radio" of Macon First Baptist Church and the "Maximize Your Health Radio Show with Dr Rose" on Sundays.

Throughout the day the local on-air programmers who can be heard on KTCM include, Brad Boyer, Bill Peterson, Brad Tregnago, Aaron Wood, Eric Messersmith, Brian Hauswirth, Matt Tarnawa, Matt Elliott, Brennan Holtzclaw, Dan Patterson and Curt Derr.

History
This station originally went on the air October 15, 2007.

References

External links
 

TCM
Macon County, Missouri
Alpha Media radio stations